The 2014–15 Getafe CF season was the 32nd season in club history and its 11th in the top-flight La Liga.

Squad statistics

Appearances and goals
Updated as of 30 May 2015.

|-
! colspan=14 style=background:#dcdcdc; text-align:center| Players who have made an appearance or had a squad number this season but have been loaned out or transferred

|}

Competitions

Overall

La Liga

League table

Matches
Kickoff times are in CET.

Copa del Rey

Round of 32

Round of 16

Quarter-finals

References

Getafe CF seasons
Getafe CF